Magnesium chromate is a chemical compound, with the formula MgCrO4.  It is a yellow, odorless, water-soluble solid with several important industrial uses. This chromate can be manufactured as a powder.

History
Before 1940, the literature about magnesium chromate and its hydrates was sparse, but studies starting in that year looked at its properties and solubility.

Uses
It is available commercially in a variety of powders, from nanoscale to micron-sized, either as an anhydrous or hydrated form.

As a hydrate, it is useful as a corrosion inhibitor and pigment, or as an ingredient in cosmetics.
In 2011, an undecahydrate (containing 11 molecules of water) of this compound was discovered by scientists at the University College London.

Hazards
Magnesium chromate hydrate should be stored at room temperature, and there is no current therapeutic use.  It is a confirmed carcinogen, and can cause acute and dermititis, and possibly kidney and liver damage if inhaled, so it should be treated as a hazardous waste.

References

Magnesium compounds
Chromates